Tractable is a technology company that develops Artificial Intelligence (AI) to assess damage to property and vehicles. The AI allows users to appraise damage digitally.

Technology 

Tractable's technology uses computer vision and deep learning to automate the appraisal of visual damage in accident and disaster recovery, for example to a vehicle. Drivers can be directed to use the application by their insurer after an accident, with the aim of settling their claim more quickly. The AI evaluates the damage from images, and therefore doesn't assess what isn't visible (such as, for example, interior damage to a vehicle or property).

History 

Alexandre Dalyac and Razvan Ranca founded Tractable in 2014, and Adrien Cohen joined as co-founder in 2015. The company employs more than 200 staff members, largely in the United Kingdom.

Tractable was named one of the 100 leading AI companies in the world in 2020 and 2021 by CB Insights. It won the Best Technology Award in the 2020 British Insurance Awards.

In June 2021, Tractable announced a venture round that valued the company at $1 billion. Tractable was the UK's 100th billion-dollar tech company, or unicorn.

References 

Technology companies established in 2014
British companies established in 2014
Vehicle insurance
Applied machine learning
Computer vision software